The 7.58 cm Minenwerfer a.A. (alter Art or "old model"), also 7.58 cm Leichter Minenwerfer  (7.58 cm leMW, sometimes also LMW; "light mine launcher"), was a German First World War mortar.

History

The Russo-Japanese War of 1905 had shown the value of mortars against modern fieldworks and fortifications and the Germans were in the process of fielding a whole series of mortars before the beginning of World War I. Their term for them was Minenwerfer, literally mine-thrower; they were initially assigned to engineer units in their siege warfare role. By the Winter of 1916-17, they were transferred to infantry units where the leMW's light weight permitted them to accompany the foot-soldiers in the advance.

In common with Rheinmetall's other Minenwerfer designs, the leMW was a rifled muzzle-loader that had hydraulic cylinders on each side of the tube to absorb the recoil forces and spring recuperators to return the tube to the firing position. It had a rectangular firing platform with limited traverse and elevation. Wheels could be added to ease transportation or it could be carried by at least six men. In 1916, a new model, designated as the n.A. or neuer Art ("new version"), was fielded that included a circular firing platform, giving a turntable effect, which permitted a full 360 degree traverse. It also had a longer  barrel and could be used for direct fire between 0° and 27° elevation if the new 90 kg (200 lb) trail was fitted to absorb the recoil forces. In this mode it was pressed into service as an anti-tank gun.

See also
 Minenwerfer

Weapons of comparable role, performance and era
 Stokes mortar : approximate British equivalent

References 

 Jäger, Herbert. German Artillery of World War One. Ramsbury, Marlborough, Wiltshire: Crowood Press, 2001

External links

 7.58 cm leMW on Landships
 German light mortars on Landships
 List and pictures of WW1 surviving guns
 "Notes on the New German Light Trench Mortar 7.6 cm". THE FIELD ARTILLERY JOURNAL. VOLUME VIII NUMBER 3 JULY SEPTEMBER 1918. THE UNITED STATES FIELD ARTILLERY ASSOCIATION WASHINGTON, D. C.

1909 establishments in Germany
World War I infantry mortars of Germany
76 mm artillery
Rheinmetall